Mariano Savastano is an Italian prefectural commissioner, best known because he served as special Commissioner of the city of Lodi, Lombardy.

He was the acting Mayor of Lodi from 2016 to 2017 until Sara Casanova was elected as new Mayor of Lodi in the 2017 early election.

References 

Living people
1964 births